Bellows is an English surname. Notable people with the surname include:

 Albert Fitch Bellows (1829–1883), American painter
 Brian Bellows (born 1964), Canadian ice hockey player
 Carole Bellows (born 1935), American judge
 Franklin Barney Bellows (1896–1918), American soldier
 Gil Bellows (born 1967), Canadian film and television actor
 George Bellows (1882–1925), American painter
 Henry Adams Bellows (justice) (1803–1873), American lawyer and politician
 Henry Adams Bellows (businessman) (1885–1939), American executive and translator
 Henry Whitney Bellows (1814–1882), American clergyman
 Jim Bellows (1922–2009), American journalist
 John Bellows (1831–1902), English polymath, printer and lexicographer
 Kent Bellows (1949–2005), American realist painter
 Kieffer Bellows (born 1998), American ice hockey player
 Laurel G. Bellows (fl. 2012–2013), American lawyer
 Shenna Bellows (born 1975), American political activist, non-profit executive director, and politician

Fictional characters
 The Bellows Family, family that includes Sarah, Ephraim, Delanie, Gertrude and Harold Bellows in the 2019 film Scary Stories to Tell in the Dark

See also
 Bellow (disambiguation)
 Bellows (disambiguation)

English-language surnames